21088 Chelyabinsk, provisional designation , is a stony asteroid and near-Earth object of the Amor group, approximately 4 kilometers in diameter. It was discovered on 30 January 1992, by Belgian astronomer Eric Elst at ESO's La Silla Observatory in northern Chile. The asteroid was named after the Russian city of Chelyabinsk and for its spectacular Chelyabinsk meteor event in 2013.

Classification and orbit 

Chelyabinsk orbits the Sun at a distance of 1.3–2.1 AU once every 2 years and 3 months (814 days). Its orbit has an eccentricity of 0.24 and an inclination of 38° with respect to the ecliptic. A first precovery was taken during the Digitized Sky Survey at the Australia Siding Spring Observatory in January 1990, extending the asteroid's observation arc by 2 years prior to its official discovery at La Silla.

Close approaches 

This is, however, far too large to make it a potentially hazardous asteroid, which have intersection distances of less than 20 LD. It also crosses the orbit of Mars at 1.666 AU which makes it a Mars-crossing asteroid.

Physical characteristics 
 
Chelyabinsk has been characterized as both a Q-type and L-type asteroid. It is also a generically assumed S-type asteroid.

Lightcurves 

Two rotational light-curves of Chelyabinsk were obtained by Czech astronomer Petr Pravec at Ondřejov Observatory in December 2002 and September 2004, respectively. They gave a rotation period of 22.490 and  hours, each with a brightness variation of 0.13 magnitude.

Diameter and albedo 

According to the survey carried out by the NEOWISE mission of NASA's Wide-field Infrared Survey Explorer (WISE), Chelyabinsk measures between 2.79 and 4.2 kilometers in diameter and its surface has an albedo between 0.21 and 0.37, while observations by the Japanese Akari satellite gave an albedo of 0.26 and a diameter of 3.5 kilometers. The Collaborative Asteroid Lightcurve Link adopts Petr Pravec's revised WISE results, that is, a diameter of 4.23 kilometers and an albedo of 0.179 based on an absolute magnitude of 14.35.

Naming 

This minor planet is named after the Russian city Chelyabinsk, located in the Urals, Siberia. The city is well known for the Chelyabinsk meteor, a 20-meter sized, extremely bright fireball that exploded to the south of the city at an altitude of 30 kilometers on 15 February 2013. The indirect effects of the explosion injured more than 1,500 people. The official naming citation was published by the Minor Planet Center (MPC) on 21 August 2013.

Erratum 

Originally, the name "Chelyabinsk" was erroneously given by the MPC to the numerically similar asteroid  on 22 July. The wrong designation  was deleted in the subsequent publication of the Minor Planet Circulars on 21 August 2013

Notes

References

External links 
 Asteroid Lightcurve Database (LCDB), query form (info )
 Dictionary of Minor Planet Names, Google books
 Asteroids and comets rotation curves, CdR – Observatoire de Genève, Raoul Behrend
 
 
 

021088
Discoveries by Eric Walter Elst
Named minor planets
19920130